Chak Bangla  is a village in Chanditala I community development block of Srirampore subdivision in Hooghly district in the Indian state of West Bengal.

Geography

Gram panchayat
Villages in Haripur gram panchayat are: Anantarampur, Bade Sola, Baghati, Ban Panchbere, Chak Bangla, Chota Choughara, Dudhkomra, Haripur, Ichhapasar, Jagmohanpur, Mamudpur and Radhaballabhpur.

Demographics
As per 2011 Census of India, Chak Bangla had a total population of 340 of which 161 (47%) were males and 179 (53%) were females. Population below 6 years was 44. The total number of literates in Chak Bangla was 192 (64.86% of the population over 6 years).

References 

Villages in Chanditala I CD Block